Neve Tzedek (lit. Abode of Justice) is a neighborhood located in southwestern Tel Aviv, Israel. It was the first Jewish neighborhood to be built outside the old city of the ancient port of Jaffa. Originally it was a Sephardi Jewish neighbourhood.  Since the 1990s, rundown properties have been restored and it is now a fashionable quarter of Tel Aviv.

Name
Literally, Neve Tzedek means Abode of Justice, but it is also one of the names for God.

History
 

Neve Tzedek was established by a group of Sephardi Jewish families seeking to move outside of over-crowded Jaffa. Notably, the family of Aharon Chelouche moved to the area in 1883 with some 50 families following suit in the next few years. The neighbourhood was officially established in 1887. Additional neighborhoods grew up around Neve Tzedek, among them Neve Shalom (1890), Yefe Nof (1897) and Batei Feingold (1904).

The new quarter featured low-rise buildings along narrow streets. These homes frequently incorporated design elements from the Jugendstil/Art Nouveau and later Bauhaus art movements and some had contemporary luxuries such as private bathrooms.

At the beginning of the 1900s, the neighborhood attracted upcoming artists and writers, among them future Nobel prize laureate Shmuel Yosef (Shai) Agnon and the Jewish  artist Nachum Gutman. Rabbi Abraham Isaac Kook  was the first rabbi of Neve Tzedek and opened a Yeshiva there.  During his time in Neve Tzedek he became close friends with many of the writers, especially Agnon.

As Tel Aviv began to develop, many affluent residents moved northward. The buildings fell into disrepair due to neglect and the corrosive effects of the coastal climate.  By the 1960s, the neighborhood suffered from serious urban decay.  However, plans to demolish the neighbourhood to make way for high rise apartments fell through as many buildings were declared heritage sites worthy of preservation. By the end of the 1980s, work began to renovate and preserve Neve Tzedek's century-old structures. New establishments were housed in old buildings, most notably the Suzanne Dellal Centre for Dance and Theatre and the Nachum Gutman Museum, located in the artist's home. This gentrification led to Neve Tzedek's rebirth as a fashionable and popular upmarket residence for Tel Avivians. Its main streets became lined once again with artists' studios, including the ceramics studio of Samy D., alongside trendy cafés and bars, and more recently boutique hotels and shops selling handmade goods.

Education
The , a French international school, is in Neve Tzedek.

Development plans

In 2009, the Tel Aviv municipality began to approve plans to construct a number of new highways and widened arterial roads throughout southern Tel Aviv, including the proposed railway road, which would partially encircle Neve Tzedek. As part of these plans, the municipality approved the construction of a large number of skyscrapers in and around Neve Tzedek. A number of parking lots would also be constructed along Rothschild Boulevard in order to handle the parking demand induced by the new road space.

Opponents of this plan argued that the addition of new skyscraper-lined highways would dramatically alter the historical and social character of Neve Tzedek and its surrounding areas in southern Tel Aviv. Furthermore, residents and environmentalists were concerned about the effects of large amounts of traffic being funneled through the area. Opponents believe that the discussions have been conducted outside of the public view and with developers' interests being put before those of the community.

Notable residents
Roman Abramovich (born 1966), Chelsea FC owner, businessman, investor, and politician
Shmuel Yosef Agnon (1888–1970), modern Hebrew writer, Nobel Prize laureate for literature
Baruch Agadati (1895–1976), classical ballet dancer, choreographer, painter, and film producer and director
Yosef Haim Brenner (1881–1921), pioneer of modern Hebrew literature
Aharon Chelouche (born 1827), Algerian Jewish businessman, co-founder of the neighborhood
Yosef Eliyahu Chelouche (1870–1934), son of Aharon, one of the founders of Tel Aviv, entrepreneur, businessman and industrialist
Gal Gadot (born 1985), actress and model
Miriam Glazer-Ta'asa (born 1929), politician
Nachum Gutman (1898–1980), painter, sculptor, and children's books author
Yoram Kaniuk (1930–2013), writer, painter, journalist, and theater critic
Sara Levi-Tanai (1910–2005), choreographer and songwriter
Israel Rokach (1886–1959), politician, second mayor of Tel Aviv (1936–1953), son of Shimon Rokach, one of the founders of the neighborhood

See also
Neighborhoods of Tel Aviv

References

External links
 Neve Tzedek neighborhood association opposed to high-rise development
  Neve Tzedek Virtual tour

Neighborhoods of Tel Aviv
Jews and Judaism in Ottoman Palestine
1886 establishments in the Ottoman Empire
1880s establishments in Ottoman Syria